SS Lindus was an Australian iron-hulled coastal cargo ship driven by a 160 H.P. 2-cylinder compound steam engine with a top cruising speed of 10 knots. She was built in 1881 by Edward Withy & Co., Hartlepool, England. Her engines were built by T. Richardson & Sons, Hartlepool. She had a complement of 24 crewmembers.

Shipwrecked

References

Further reading 
Online Databases
 
 
 
Books
 Wrecks on the New South Wales Coast. By Loney, J. K. (Jack Kenneth), 1925–1995 Oceans Enterprises. 1993 .
Australian shipwrecks Vol.3 1871–1900 By Loney, J. K. (Jack Kenneth), 1925–1995. Geelong Vic: List Publishing, 1982 910.4530994 LON

Shipwrecks of the Hunter Region
Ships built on the River Tees
1881 ships
Maritime incidents in 1899
1899 in Australia
1871–1900 ships of Australia
Merchant ships of Australia
Iron and steel steamships of Australia